Eupithecia serpentigena is a moth in the family Geometridae. It is endemic to China (Sichuan).

The forewings are pale grey, but darker at the apex and marginal area and the hindwings are clear white, marked with grey-brown shading in the area of the anal margin.

References

External links

Moths described in 2006
Endemic fauna of Sichuan
Moths of Asia
serpentigena